The men's hammer throw event at the 2000 Asian Athletics Championships was held in Jakarta, Indonesia on 29 August.

Results

References

2000 Asian Athletics Championships
Hammer throw at the Asian Athletics Championships